Norman Müller (born 7 August 1985 in Eisleben, Saxony-Anhalt) is a German decathlete. He won the men's national title in the decathlon in 2008.

Competition record

References

1985 births
Living people
People from Eisleben
German decathletes
Sportspeople from Saxony-Anhalt